Swe Swe Win (born ) was a Burmese female weightlifter, competing in the 53 kg category and representing Myanmar at international competitions. 

She competed at world championships, most recently at the 1999 World Weightlifting Championships, and the 2000 Summer Olympics.

Major results

References

External links
 

1975 births
Living people
Burmese female weightlifters
Place of birth missing (living people)
Weightlifters at the 1998 Asian Games
Weightlifters at the 2002 Asian Games
Asian Games medalists in weightlifting
World Weightlifting Championships medalists
Weightlifters at the 2000 Summer Olympics
Olympic weightlifters of Myanmar
Medalists at the 1998 Asian Games
Asian Games bronze medalists for Myanmar
Southeast Asian Games gold medalists for Myanmar
Southeast Asian Games silver medalists for Myanmar
Southeast Asian Games medalists in weightlifting
Competitors at the 2001 Southeast Asian Games